"You'll Think of Me" is a song written by Darrell Brown, Ty Lacy, and Dennis Matkosky and recorded by Australian country music singer Keith Urban. It was released in January 2004 as the fourth and final single from his 2002 album Golden Road. The song reached number one with a two-week stay on the U.S. Billboard Hot Country Songs chart. It additionally peaked at number 24 on the Billboard Hot 100 and at number 2 on the US Adult Contemporary chart. It even peaked at number 6 on the US Adult Top 40 chart.

Music video 
The music video was directed by Sam Erickson and premiered in January 2004.

Personnel
As listed in liner notes.
 Keith Urban — lead and backing vocals, lead and rhythm guitar
 Tom Bukovac — rhythm guitar
 Matt Chamberlain — drums
 Eric Darken — percussion
 Dan Dugmore — guitars
 Steve Nathan — keyboards
 Jimmie Lee Sloas — bass guitar
 Russell Terrell — background vocals

Chart performance

Weekly charts

Year-end charts

Certifications

Awards
In 2006, this song became Keith Urban's first to win the Grammy Award for Best Male Country Vocal Performance.

References

2004 singles
Keith Urban songs
Songs written by Darrell Brown (musician)
Song recordings produced by Dann Huff
Capitol Records Nashville singles
2002 songs
Songs written by Dennis Matkosky
Songs written by Ty Lacy
Grammy Award for Best Male Country Vocal Performance winners
Country ballads